Wilkins Micawber is a clerk in Charles Dickens's 1850 novel David Copperfield. He is traditionally identified with the optimistic belief that "something will turn up."

His role in the story

Micawber was incarcerated in debtors' prison (the King's Bench Prison) after failing to meet his creditors' demands. His long-suffering wife, Emma, stands by him despite his financial exigencies that force her to pawn all of her family's heirlooms.  She lives by the maxims, "I will never desert Mr. Micawber!" and "Experientia does it!" (from Experientia docet, "One learns by experience.")

Micawber is responsible for a major financial setback to another character. The hardworking, reliable Tommy Traddles, who is saving to furnish a home for the young woman he hopes to marry, allows his optimism to overcome his common sense. He "lends his name" to Micawber by co-signing for his rent, and when Micawber fails to pay, Micawber's creditors seize all of the Micawber family's furniture and personal effects, along with those of Traddles. Although Traddles eventually recovers the little round table and flower pot that symbolize his hopes for future happiness, he hampers himself financially by paying off Micawber's debt.

Micawber is hired as a clerk by the scheming Uriah Heep, who assumes wrongly that Micawber's debts arise from dishonesty.  But working for Heep allows Micawber to expose his boss as a forger and a cheat. To start anew, Micawber and his family emigrate to Australia with Daniel Peggotty and Little Em'ly, where Micawber becomes manager of the Port Middlebay Bank and a successful government magistrate. Prior to leaving, Micawber repays the money Traddles spent settling his loan.

In Hablot Knight Browne's illustrations for the first edition, Micawber is shown wearing knee-breeches, a top hat, and a monocle. Micawber was modelled on Dickens' father, John Dickens.

Popular culture

Micawber is known for asserting his faith that "something will turn up." His name has become synonymous with someone who lives in hopeful expectation.  This has formed the basis for the Micawber Principle, based upon his observation in Chapter 12:

Written in full, the expenditure amounts are nineteen pounds, nineteen shillings and sixpence (£19/19/6) and £20/0/6, the pre-decimal equivalents of £19.97½ and £20.02½ in modern British currency.

The character was played by W.C. Fields in the 1935 screen classic, Personal History, Adventures, Experience, and Observation of David Copperfield the Younger.  Bob Hoskins took the role in a 1999 BBC serial. Peter Capaldi played Micawber in the 2019 Armando Iannucci film The Personal History of David Copperfield.

Keith Richards of the Rolling Stones named one of his guitars (an early 1950s Fender Telecaster with a Gibson PAF humbucking pickup installed in the neck position) "Micawber"; Richards is known to be a fan of Dickens. "There's no reason for my guitar being called Micawber, apart from the fact that it's such an unlikely name. There's no one around me called Micawber, so when I scream for Micawber everyone knows what I'm talking about."

The character formed the basis of Micawber, a 2001 ITV drama series written by John Sullivan and starring David Jason in the title leading role. In the U.S. Supreme Court opinion of Bell Atlantic Corp. v. Twombly, 550 U.S. 544, 562 (2007), Justice Souter criticized the court for an approach to pleading that "would dispense with any showing of a reasonably founded hope that a plaintiff would be able to make a case; Mr. Micawber's optimism would be enough."

Entry into general English
The character of Wilkins Micawber has given rise to the English noun "Micawber" and the adjectives "Micawberish" and "Micawberesque." The Merriam-Webster Dictionary defines a Micawber as "one who is poor but lives in optimistic expectation of better fortune." Judge David Halpern described Craig Whyte's legal arguments in a case heard in 2013 as "pure Micawberism."

Quotations

Besides the Micawber Principle, Micawber is notable for a number of memorable quotations:
 I have no doubt I shall, please Heaven, begin to be more beforehand with the world, and to live in a perfectly new manner, if—in short, anything turns up. - (Chapter 11)
 Every happiness and prosperity! If, in the progress of revolving years, I could persuade myself that my blighted destiny had been a warning to you, I should feel that I had not occupied another man's place altogether in vain. - (Chapter 12)
 You HEEP of infamy! - (Chapter 52)
 I trust that the labour and hazard of an investigation -of which the smallest results have been slowly pieced together, in the pressure of arduous avocations, under grinding penurious apprehensions, at rise of morn, at dewy eve, in the shadows of night, under the watchful eye of one whom it were superfluous to call Demon, combined with the struggle of parental Poverty to turn it, when completed, to the right account, may be as the sprinkling of a few drops of sweet water on my funeral pyre.  I ask no more. Let it be, in justice, merely said of me, as of a gallant and eminent Naval Hero, with whom I have no pretensions to cope, that what I have done, I did, in despite of mercenary and selfish objectives, "FOR ENGLAND, HOME AND BEAUTY." Remaining always, &c, &c, Wilkins Micawber.
 Welcome poverty!..Welcome misery, welcome houselessness, welcome hunger, rags, tempest, and beggary! Mutual confidence will sustain us to the end!

Film and television portrayals

Quotations from the 1935 film

Boy, as I have frequently had occasion to observe: "When the stomach is empty, the spirits are low!"
 Remember my motto "Nil Desperandum! -Never despair!"

Quotation from the BBC TV/Masterpiece Theatre production

 (featuring Bob Hoskins as Micawber) "I could not depart this metropolis without paying a valedictory visit to my dear friend Copperfield, in whose debt I shall forever remain (I speak metaphorically of course!)"

Sources
 Bloom, Harold. (1992) David Copperfield (Major Literary Characters Series). New York: Chelsea House Publishers.
 Hawes, Donald. (2002) Who's Who in Dickens. 2nd. ed. London: Routledge 
 Oddie, W. (1967) "Mr. Micawber and the redefinition of experience." The Dickensian 63:109.

References

Literary characters introduced in 1850
David Copperfield characters
Fictional businesspeople
Fictional clerks
Male characters in film
Male characters in literature
Male characters in television